Mełno may refer to:

Mełno, Brodnica County, Poland
Mełno, Grudziądz County, Poland
Mełno-Cukrownia, Poland